The Samford Bulldogs football program is the intercollegiate American football team for Samford University located in Homewood, Alabama. The team competes at the NCAA Division I Football Championship Subdivision (FCS) level as a member of the Southern Conference (SoCon). Samford's first football team was fielded in 1902. The team was known as the Howard Bulldogs through the 1965 season when Howard College was renamed as Samford University. Howard was located in Birmingham, Alabama prior to 1957. Since 1958, the Bulldogs have played their home games at Seibert Stadium, which now has a seating capacity of 6,700, in Homewood. Chris Hatcher has served as Samford's head coach since the 2015 season.

History

Classifications
 1937–1971: NA
 1972: NCAA College Division
 1973: NCAA Division III
 1974–1983: no program
 1984–1988: NCAA Division III
 1989–present: NCAA Division I–AA/FCS

Conference memberships
 1902–1905: Independent
 1906–1931: Southern Intercollegiate Athletic Association
 1931–1954: Dixie Conference
 1955–1972: Independent
 1973: NCAA Division III independent
 1974–1983: No program
 1984–1988: NCAA Division III independent
 1989–2002: NCAA Division I–AA independent
 2003–2007: Ohio Valley Conference
 2008–present: Southern Conference

Conference Championships

The Bulldogs have won 4 conference championships, with three coming in the Dixie Conference and two in the Southern Conference.

† Co-champions

Division I-AA/FCS Playoffs results
The Bulldogs have appeared in the I-AA/FCS playoffs six times with an overall record of 3–6.

Notable former players
 Bobby Bowden 
 James Bradberry
 Cortland Finnegan
 Jimbo Fisher
 Scott Fountain
 Jeremy Towns
 Ahmad Gooden
 Devlin Hodges
 Michael Pierce
 Nate Schenker
 Jaquiski Tartt
 Montrell Washington
 Corey White
 Nick Williams

Future non-conference opponents 
Announced schedules as of December 8, 2022.

References

External links
 

 
American football teams established in 1902
1902 establishments in Alabama